Boksburg F.C. is a South African football club. They competed in the National Football League.

References

National Football League (South Africa) clubs
Soccer clubs in South Africa